Tampa College was a private business college founded as a coeducational, nonsectarian, and proprietary institution, in 1890. The school was originally located in Tampa, Florida. The final owner, Corinthian Colleges, folded the school into its Everest brand.

History
The school's mission was to provide practical education in areas of business such as bookkeeping and standard shorthand. The original college building (Davis) was three stories and located in the heart of the city.  The school was open all year long and was the most up to date in the South.

College departments included Business/Bookkeeping, Stenography/Typewriting, Telegraphy, Penmanship, and English.
Full scholarship tuition for any one department was $40.00
Full scholarship tuition for any two departments was $60.00
Monthly tuition was set at $8.50
Three months of tuition for any one department was set at $25.00
Board, room, and other facilities was $12.50 to $15.00 per month

Accreditation, Licensure, and Recognition
Tampa College was chartered as a degree-granting institution in 1953 by the State of Florida. The college was licensed by means of accreditation by the Florida Commission for Independent Education.

It was also accredited by the Accrediting Council for Independent Colleges and Schools (ACICS) as a senior college of business to award Diplomas, Associate degrees, Bachelor's degrees, and master's degrees. Medical programs were accredited by the Accrediting Bureau of Health Education Schools (ABHES).

Institutional Timeline
1890, Tampa Business College was founded as a private, coeducational, and nonsectarian institution 
1897, L.M. Hatton appointed President, Tampa Business College
1904, Capital Stock, State of Florida, $10,000, 10% paid in Dec 1904
1917, Practical Bookkeeping published p. 47, LM Hatton and J.A. Prowinsky
1929, Sacred Heart High School renamed "Tampa College High School" for affiliation with Tampa Business College
1939, Tampa College High School renamed to "Jesuit High School"
1940's - 60's, Active in local high schools, US Air Force military contract to teach administration courses
1970, Tampa Business College renamed "Tampa College"
1970, Affiliation begins with Jones Business College of Jacksonville
1968-77, Training programs for returning veterans of Vietnam
1970, President, Ralph H. Hanna, opened a new campus in Pinellas County
1977-87, Eugene Roberts, Lakeland businessman, owned and operated the Lakeland and Brandon branches as Lakeland College of Business. Roberts served as Director of Admissions at the University of South Florida and as Assistant Director of Admissions at Florida Southern College
1982-88, President of Sumitt System of Colleges and Schools, Donald C. Jones
1987-88, Jack H. Jones of Jones Business College purchases Phillips College, Lakeland College of Business, and Tampa College. Schools become part of Summit System of Colleges and Schools
1989, Phillips College acquires Tampa College along with the other Summit System of Colleges and Schools
1995, Tampa College closed with pending lawsuits from students.
1995, Tampa College renamed "Florida Metropolitan University"
2007, Florida Metropolitan University renamed "Everest University"
2010, Everest University Everest University
2015, Everest University was purchased by a nonprofit parent company, ECMC and Zenith Education Group
2016, Everest University was renamed "Alterius Career College"
2023, Altierus Career College will begin teaching out the remainder of its courses as it not taking any new student enrollments.

Notable Instructors/Alumni 
Samuel Henry Harris, Florida House of Representatives 1941, 1943, 1945, Sixth Judicial Circuit Judge, 1957 
Don Herndon, professional football player
Dean Hamilton, Clearwater Campus, 1993-1995 (he was there before then and after that)
Peter Nicholas "Nick" Nazaretian, Hillsborough County Court Judge and host of truTV cable network's "Pet Court," 2010

References

External links 
Everest University Web site
CCi
Florida Department of Education
FLDOE Course Numbering System
Council for Higher Education (CHEA)

Former for-profit universities and colleges in the United States
Colleges accredited by the Accrediting Council for Independent Colleges and Schools
Universities and colleges in Hillsborough County, Florida
Educational institutions established in 1890
Corinthian Colleges
2007 disestablishments in Florida
1890 establishments in Florida

no:Florida Metro University